Angolemi is a village in the Nicosia District of Cyprus, southwest of Morphou. De facto, it is administered as part of the Lefke District of Northern Cyprus.

Etymology 
According to a suggestion, the name Angolemi is given by the Lusignans, after the town of Angoulême in France. Some sources say that a knight from Angoulême lived in the village in the Middle Ages.

Another suggestion says that the name is derived from the former Patriarch of Antioch, Pierre d'Angoulême.

The village is commonly known as Angolem among local people.

Architecture 
The houses in the village are mainly made of adobe, while concrete ones are also present. The village has developed to the fields outside the village since early 2000s.

Many houses are neglected and abandoned because of migration to Nicosia. There are unused vehicles in the streets.

Demographics 
The first information about the population of the village is from the time of Mahmud II.

References

Communities in Nicosia District
Populated places in Lefke District